Oleksii Yuriyovych Reznikov (born 18 June 1966) is a Ukrainian lawyer and politician who has served as the Minister of Defence of Ukraine since 4 November 2021. Reznikov previously has served in several other positions in the government of Ukraine; Deputy Prime Minister, Minister for Reintegration of the Temporarily Occupied Territories of Ukraine, deputy head of the Kyiv City State Administration from 2016 to 2018, and deputy mayor-secretary of the Kyiv City Council from June 2014 to December 2015.

Early life and education 
Reznikov was born on 18 June 1966 in Lviv, which was then part of the Ukrainian Soviet Socialist Republic in the Soviet Union. His father, Yurii Reznikov was a professor, Master of Sports in Acrobatics, Provost of the Lviv State Institute of Physical Culture. His mother, Olena Reznikova, was a neurologist at Lviv neuropsychiatric clinic, Master of Sports in Rhythmic Gymnastics.

From 1984 to 1986, Reznikov served in the Soviet Air Forces, serving with the 806th Bombardment Aviation Regiment at Lutsk and Military Unit 87358 at Novohrad-Volynskyi.

Reznikov attended Lviv University, receiving a master's degree with honours in Law in 1991. During his university years, Reznikov actively participated in student life: he won the Law Student Olympics across the Ukrainian SSR in the individual and team competitions and represented Ukraine at the Law Student Olympics across the Soviet Union.

In addition to Ukrainian, Reznikov is fluent in Russian, English, and Polish.

Career

Professional career 
Reznikov's professional career began during his last year of university, when he co-founded the brokerage company Galicia Securities. Between 1999 and 2002, he served as the Deputy Head of the Ukrainian Legislation Centre in Kyiv. He also established Pravis law firm (later Reznikov, Vlasenko and Partners), which, in 2006, merged with the law firm Magister and Partners to become Magisters.

In 2009 and 2010, Magisters won the Chambers Europe Award. In 2010, British magazine The Lawyer named Magisters the best law firm in Russia and the CIS. In 2011, Magisters was subject of a friendly takeover by Egorov, Puginsky, Afanasiev and Partners, an international group with offices in London, Moscow, Saint Petersburg, Kyiv, Minsk and Washington, D.C. Until 3 July 2014, Reznikov headed the Department for Disputes and served as General Counsel of Egorov, Puginsky, Afanasiev and Partners.

During his law practice, Reznikov defended then-presidential candidate Viktor Yushchenko before the Supreme Court of Ukraine, and the third round of the 2004 Ukrainian presidential election was annulled.

Reznikov represented B. Fuksman and O. Rodnyanskiy in their case against the "Studio 1 + 1" in the company of Central European Media Enterprises, pertaining to their share of the ownership. He represented "Investment-Metallurgical Union" Consortium defending the legality of privatization of the "Krivorozhstal"; defended PFC "Dnieper" on privatization of the "Nikopol Ferroalloy Plant". Reznikov also represented several other people, including Savik Shuster, Vladimir Gusinsky, OJSC "Arsellor Mittal Kryviy Rih" company "Quasar" Sadogan Petroleum, DCH, FC "Metallist" (on charges of violating the principles of fair play), IA "IMC" Corporation " Interpipe ". He gained extensive experience in representing clients in the Supreme Economic Court of Ukraine, the Higher Administrative Court of Ukraine, the Supreme Court of Ukraine, and in the Court of Arbitration for Sport in Lausanne.

On 20 June 2014, Reznikov's advocacy license (originally issued on 10 March 1994) was suspended, due to his appointment as the Secretary of the Kyiv City Council.

In November 2018, Reznikov renewed his legal practice as a partner at the Asters Law Firm. Oleksii focuses on alternative dispute resolution including: expert determination, negotiation, facilitation, conciliation, mediation, fact-finding, early neutral evaluation, settlement conference and settlement agreements.

Political career

In the 2014 Kyiv local election, Reznikov was elected to Kyiv City Council's 7th convocation as a member of Solidarity. Reznikov served as chairman of the Kyiv City Council Commission for the Restitution of the Rights of the Rehabilitated. On 19 June 2014, Reznikov was appointed Deputy Mayor – Secretary of the Kyiv City Council.

Reznikov has served in multiple positions, including as head of Ukraine's National delegation in Congress of Local and Regional Authorities of the Council of Europe from 2015 to 2016. Afterwards, he turned to activism, serving as Deputy Chairman of the Mayor Anti-Corruption Council, as a board member of the "Let's Do it Together" social project. At the same time, he also remained in government becoming a member of the Reformation Team for the Decentralisation, Local Government and Regional Policy of the Ministry of Communities and Territories Development.

On 18 September 2019, President Volodymyr Zelensky authorised Reznikov to represent Ukraine in the working political subgroup at the Trilateral Contact Group on a Donbas settlement. On 5 May 2020 President Volodymyr Zelensky authorised Reznikov to First Deputy Head of the Ukrainian delegation at the Trilateral Contact Group.

On 4 March 2020, Reznikov was appointed Deputy Prime Minister, Minister for Reintegration of the Temporarily Occupied Territories of Ukraine in the Shmyhal Government.

On 1 November 2021, Reznikov submitted his letter of resignation from the Deputy Prime Minister, Minister for Reintegration of the Temporarily Occupied Territories of Ukraine role. This resignation request was registered by the Verkhovna Rada on 1 November 2021. On 3 November 2021 the Verkhovna Rada dismissed him as Minister for Reintegration of the Temporarily Occupied Territories of Ukraine, and subsequently appointed him Minister of Defence.

In December 2021 he said Germany had vetoed Ukraine's purchase of anti-drone rifles and anti-sniper systems via the NATO Support and Procurement Agency.

On 26 February 2022, two days after Russia invaded Ukraine, Reznikov had a call with Belarus's minister of defense Viktor Khrenin, who on behalf of Russia's minister of defense Sergei Shoigu offered to stop the invasion if Ukraine capitulated. Reznikov replied that he is "ready to accept the capitulation from the Russian side."

In February 2023, the head of the Servant of the People parliamentary bloc, Davyd Arakhamia, stated that Reznikov would be replaced by Kyrylo Budanov as defence minister.

Personal life 
Reznikov participates in trophy and rally raids, enjoys scuba diving, playing tennis, and skiing. He was the director of the amateur short films "People-quad" and  "People-ATV: Elusive Again." He has over 260 diving expeditions, 163 parachute jumps, and tens of thousands of kilometres travelled on ATV over rough terrain.

In 2009 he took part in the Silk Way Rally in the Dakar Series as a co-pilot and navigator. The rally took place on the territory of three countries (Russia, Kazakhstan and Turkmenistan) and Karakum Desert.

 Two-time silver medallist of the Ukraine trophy-raid (2011–2012);
 Champion of the Ukraine trophy-raid (2013);
 Master of Sport of Ukraine in Motorsport.

Honours and awards 
 In 2019, at a reception dedicated to Independence Day, the Ambassador of the Republic of Poland to Ukraine Bartosz Jan Cichocki presented Oleksii Reznikov with a state award – the Silver Cross of Merit.

References

External links
 
 
 O. Reznikov speech at the Congress of Local and Regional Authorities of Europe (on 16 October 2014) 
 Mme Badlilita M Reznikov M Chiveri - interview during the Congress of Local and Regional Authorities of Europe

1966 births
Living people
University of Lviv alumni
Politicians from Lviv
21st-century Ukrainian lawyers
21st-century Ukrainian politicians
Independent politicians in Ukraine
Temporarily occupied territories and IDPs ministers of Ukraine
National Security and Defense Council of Ukraine
Vice Prime Ministers of Ukraine
Defence ministers of Ukraine
Ukrainian rally drivers